Nick Aaron Ford Jr. (August 4, 1904 – July 17, 1982) was an American writer. A native of South Carolina, he was educated at Benedict College and Iowa State University. Ford then joined the faculty of Morgan State University, eventually accepting the Alain Locke Distinguished Professorship of Black Studies.

Life and career
Ford was born in Ridgeway, South Carolina, to a former slave, Nick Aaron Ford Sr., and his wife Carrie, a substitute teacher. Sanders Ford, a member of the South Carolina Senate, was the maternal grandfather of Nick Aaron Ford Jr. Between the ages of ten and sixteen, Ford was educated at a segregated school in Winnsboro, Louisiana. He then attended a high school affiliated with Benedict College, and subsequently earned a bachelor's degree from Benedict in 1926. Subsequently, Ford was principal of the Schofield Normal School in Aiken, South Carolina, until 1928, when he enrolled at Iowa State University for graduate study in journalism. Ford earned his master's degree in 1934, and his doctorate in 1945. He taught at Morgan State College from 1945 and later became Alain Locke Distinguished Professor of Black Studies in 1973.

He chaired Morgan State University's English Department for 23 years from 1947 to 1972. He advocated for African American studies. He married Janie Etheridge in 1927, with whom he raised a son. Ford married for the second time to Ola Scroggins Ford in 1968. Nick Aaron Ford died in Baltimore, Maryland, on July 17, 1982.

Books
 
  A signed copy of this book is in the catalogue of the National Museum of African American History and Culture.
 
 
 
 Extending Horizons: Selected Readings for Cultural Enrichment

Selected publications

Legacy

In 1983 Morgan State University initiated the Nick Aaron Ford and Waters Edward Turpin Symposium on African-American Literature named in honor of Ford and Turpin, a collaborator of Ford's who joined him at Morgan State at Ford's request. Ford's papers including letters, book drafts and other writings are located at the University of South Carolina.

References

1904 births
1982 deaths
Black studies scholars
Benedict College alumni
20th-century American male writers
African-American schoolteachers
Iowa State University alumni
American school principals
Writers from South Carolina
Schoolteachers from South Carolina
Morgan State University faculty
20th-century African-American writers
People from Ridgeway, South Carolina